The 1958 Baylor Bears football team represented Baylor University in the 1958 NCAA University Division football season. The team finished with a record of 3–7.

Schedule

References

Baylor
Baylor Bears football seasons
Baylor Bears football